Isoxys (meaning "equal surfaces") is a genus of extinct bivalved Cambrian arthropod; the various species of which are thought to have been freely swimming predators. It had a pair of large spherical eyes (which are the most commonly preserved feature of the soft-bodied anatomy), and two large frontal appendages used to grasp prey.

Description 
Species of Isoxys have roughly semicircular bivalved carapaces, which vary in morphology between species. The front and rear edges of the carapaces bear foward and posterior facing spines, respectively which in some species are greatly elongated. In long-spined species when including spine length, some specimens exceed . The opening angle of the carapace was close to vertical, giving it a narrow profile when viewed from above. The head had a pair of large spherical stalked eyes, as well as a pair of upward-curling frontal appendages, which have a varying number of podomeres/segments, depending on the species. Most podomeres on the frontal appendages have endite spines, with the number and placement of spines varying between species. The last podomere of the frontal appendage is a curved terminal claw. The trunk lacks clear segmentation (arthrodization). Along the body are pairs of biramous appendages, the counts of which differ between species (Isoxys curvirostratus has 14, while Isoxys auritus has 11). The limbs have little differentiation from each other, and consist of endopods with well defined segments/podomeres, as well as exopods, which in specimens from the Chengjiang Biota have thick paddle-shaped lamellae which project perpendicular to the limb axis, while Isoxys volucris from Greenland has paddle-shaped expods fringed with setae. The end of the trunk has paired telson flaps.

Ecology 
Species of Isoxys are thought to have been actively swimming predators, using its frontal appendages to capture soft-bodied prey, with the frontalmost pairs of biramous limbs aiding in food processing. The various Isoxys species are thought to have occupied a variety of niches, from swimming just above the seafloor (nektobenthic) to open ocean swimmers (pelagic). Swimming was likely accomplished by rhythmic movement of the legs. Eyes of different specimens appear to have been adapted to different light intensities; one specimen of I. auritus was either crepuscular in shallow water, or lived in waters around 140 m below the sea surface; whereas another was morphologically adapted to a diurnal light intensity in shallow waters. Isoxys species with elongated carapace spines are likely to have engaged in vertical migration up and down the water column, like many modern marine invertebrates.

Taxonomy 

Isoxys is thought to be one of the basalmost known arthropods, showing a combination of traits characteristic of more primitive stem-group arthropods like radiodonts, like lacking an arthrodized (sclerotized and jointed) trunk exoskeleton, with those of modern arthropods, like possessing sclerotized and jointed (arthropodized) biramous limbs. It is one of two genera within the family Isoxyidae, alongside Surusicaris. A close relationship to the bivalved arthropod Tuzoia had historically been proposed based on the similarities of some aspects of their carapaces, but preserved soft tissues of Tuzoia described in 2022 suggest that they are not closely related.

Species 
20 species of Isoxys have been described, which have a global distribution, having been found in North America, Siberia, Australia, China and Europe, spanning from Cambrian Series 2 into the Miaolingian.

 Isoxys chilhoweanus Walcott, 1890 (type) Tennessee, USA, Cambrian Series 2
 Isoxys acutangulus (Walcott, 1908) Balang Formation, Guizhou, China, Cambrian Stage 4, Burgess Shale, Canada, Miaolingian
 Isoxys auritus (Jiang, 1982) Chengjiang Biota, Yunnan, China, Cambrian Stage 3,  Balang Formation, China, Cambrian Stage 4
 Isoxys curvirostratus Vannier & Chen, 2000 Chengjiang Biota, China, Cambrian Stage 3
 Isoxys paradoxus Hou, 1987 Chengjiang Biota, China, Cambrian Stage 3
 Isoxys zhurensis Ivantsov, 1990 Sinsk Formation, Siberia, Cambrian Series 2
 Isoxys bispinatus Cui, 1991 Shuijintuo Formation, Sichuan, China, Cambrian Series 2
 Isoxys glaessneri García−Bellido, Paterson, Edgecombe, Jago, Gehling & Lee, 2009 Emu Bay Shale, Australia, Cambrian Stage 4
 Isoxys communis Glaessner, 1979 Emu Bay Shale, Australia, Cambrian Stage 4
 Isoxys guanduensis Wang et al., 2012 Guanshan Biota, Yunnan, China, Cambrian Stage 4
 Isoxys minor Luo et al., 2008 Guanshan Biota, Yunnan, China, Cambrian Stage 4
 Isoxys wudingensis Luo & Hu, 2006 Guanshan Biota, Yunnan, China, Cambrian Stage 4
 Isoxys globulus Liu et al., 2018 Balang Formation, Guizhou, China, Cambrian Stage 4
 Isoxys jianheensis Liu et al., 2018 Balang Formation,  Guizhou, China, Cambrian Stage 4
 Isoxys volucris Williams, Siveter & Peel, 1996, Sirius Passet, Greenland, Cambrian Stage 3
 Isoxys mackenziensis Kimmig & Pratt 2015 Rockslide Formation, Canada, Miaolingian
 Isoxys longissimus Simonetta & Delle Cave, 1975 Burgess Shale, Canada, Miaolingian
 Isoxys carbonelli Richter & Richter, 1927, Pedroche Formation, Spain, Cambrian Series 2
 Isoxys shandongensis Wang and Huang, 2010, Mantou Formation, Shandong, China, Miaolingian

Indeterminate species are also known from the Spence Shale of Utah, dating to the Miaolingian, as well as the Kaili Biota in Guizhou, China, which also dates to the Miaolingian.

See also

 Arthropod
 Cambrian explosion
 Chengjiang biota
 List of Chengjiang Biota species by phylum

References

External links 
 

Burgess Shale fossils
Cambrian arthropods
Burgess Shale animals
Maotianshan shales fossils
Paibian
Cambrian genus extinctions
Wheeler Shale
Paleozoic life of the Northwest Territories